Aircraft disinsection is the use of insecticide on international flights and in other closed spaces for insect and disease control. Confusion with disinfection, the elimination of microbes on surfaces, is not uncommon. Insect vectors of disease, mostly mosquitoes, have been introduced into and become indigenous in geographic areas where they were not previously present. Dengue, chikungunya and Zika spread across the Pacific and into the Americas by means of the airline networks. Cases of "airport malaria", in which live malaria-carrying mosquitoes disembark and infect people near the airport, may increase with global warming.

Definitions in the International Health Regulations (IHR) of the World Health Organization are:

 "Disinfection" means the procedure whereby health measures are taken to control or kill infectious agents on a human or animal body surface or in or on baggage, cargo, containers, conveyances, goods and postal parcels by direct exposure to chemical or physical agents.
 “Disinsection” means the procedure whereby health measures are taken to control or kill the insect vectors of human diseases present in baggage, cargo, containers, conveyances, goods and postal parcels.

Disinsection is mandated by the IHR. The WHO recommends d-phenothrin (2%) for space spraying and permethrin (2%) for residual disinsection. Neither is harmful when used as recommended, according to WHO. Disinsection is one of two applications of the IHR likely to be encountered by travelers;  yellow fever vaccination is the other.

References

Aircraft operations
Pest control
Industrial hygiene